Wittenoom is a former town and a declared contaminated site,  north-north-east of Perth, in the Hamersley Range in the Pilbara region of Western Australia. The declared contaminated site comprises , making it the "largest contaminated site in the southern hemisphere".

The area around Wittenoom was mainly pastoral until the 1930s when mining for blue asbestos began. By 1939, major mining began in Yampire Gorge, which was closed in 1943 when mining began in Wittenoom Gorge. In 1947, a company town was built and, during the 1950s, it was the Pilbara's largest town. The peak population, as recorded by the Australian census conducted on 30 June 1961, was 881 (601 males and 280 females).  During the 1950s and early 1960s, Wittenoom was Australia's only supplier of blue asbestos. The mine was shut down in 1966 due to its unprofitability, and growing health concerns from asbestos mining in the area.

The former townsite no longer receives government services. In December 2006, the Government of Western Australia announced that the town's official status would be removed and, in June 2007, Jon Ford, the Minister for Regional Development, announced that the townsite had officially been degazetted. The town's name was removed from official maps and road signs, and the Shire of Ashburton is able to close roads that lead to contaminated areas.

The Wittenoom steering committee met in April 2013 to finalise closure of the town, limit access to the area, and raise awareness of the risks. Details of how that would be achieved were to be determined but it would probably necessitate removing the town's remaining residents, converting freehold land to crown land, demolishing houses, and closing or rerouting roads. By 2015, six residents remained. In 2017, the number had dropped to four, to three in 2018, and to two in 2021.

, Wittenoom has no residents, and any remaining structures are scheduled to be demolished by the Western Australian Government.

Name 
Wittenoom was named by Lang Hancock after Frank Wittenoom, his partner in the nearby Mulga Downs Station. The land around Wittenoom was originally settled by Wittenoom's brother, politician Sir Edward Horne Wittenoom.

By the late 1940s, there were calls for a government townsite near the mine, and the Mines Department recommended it be named Wittenoom, advising that adoption of that name was strongly urged by the local people.

The name was approved in 1948, but it was not until 2 May 1950 that the townsite was officially gazetted. In 1951, the name was changed to Wittenoom Gorge at the request of the mining company but, in 1974, it was changed back to Wittenoom.

The mine closed in 1966, and the official abolition of the town was gazetted in March 2007.

Religion 
In 1968, Wittenoom was one of only two Catholic parishes in the Pilbara.

History 

In 1917, the Mines Department first recorded the presence of blue asbestos in the Hamersley Ranges. In the early 1930s, Langley Hancock discovered Wittenoom Gorge, on the Mulga Downs property.

In 1937, Hancock showed samples of blue asbestos (crocidolite) that he had picked up in the Gorge to Islwyn Walters and Walter  Leonard, who were mining and treating white asbestos at Nunyerrie, and at Lionel near Nullagine. When Hancock learned the fibre would fetch £70 per ton, he immediately pegged the best claims in Wittenoom Gorge.

Leo Snell, a kangaroo shooter on Mulga Downs, pegged a claim on Yampire Gorge, where there was a lot more blue asbestos. Walters and Leonard purchased Yampire Gorge from Snell, moved their treatment plant there, and began mining and treating the fibre. When Leonard cabled London that  of asbestos in sight at Yampire Gorge, they cabled him back saying he should take a holiday. Leonard had to send a photograph before it was believed Yampire Gorge contained that much asbestos.

Walters and Leonard cleared the way into Yampire Gorge by blasting the biggest rocks and pulling them out of the way with a camel team.

By 1940, twenty-two men were employed at the Yampire Gorge workings and about 375 tons were mined and transported by mule team wagons to the coast at Point Samson. During World War II, communications with England became difficult, and de Berrales acquired an interest in the mines.

In 1943, the Colonial Sugar Company, through its subsidiary, Australian Blue Asbestos Ltd., took over both the Wittenoom and Yampire Mines. Lang Hancock, who watched his station property transform to a town, stated in 1958: "Izzy Walters was the man who stuck it and produced the market that made Wittenoom of today possible." Walter's partner, Len Leonard, put it this way in 1958: "but for his (Islwyn Walters) sheer grit and hard work there would be no such thing as Wittenoom. We have him to thank for that."

Due to a lack of profitability however, the mine at Wittenoom was closed in 1966.

Closing of the town 
As of 2016, Wittenoom had only three permanent residents who defied the Government of Western Australia's removal of services and its stated intention to demolish the town. On 30 June 2006, the Government turned off electric power to Wittenoom. There were still three residents in late 2018, when the government announced plans to force them out by compulsorily acquiring their properties.

In November 2006, a report by consultants GHD Group and Parsons Brinckerhoff evaluated the continuing risks associated with asbestos contamination in the town and surrounding areas, classing the danger to visitors as medium and to residents as extreme. In December 2006, Minister for the Pilbara and Regional Development, Jon Ford, said that Wittenoom's status as a town would be removed and, in June 2007, he announced that the townsite status had been officially removed.

Both the Department of Health and an accredited contaminated sites auditor reviewed the report, with the latter finding that the detected presence of free asbestos fibres in surface soils from sampled locations presented an unacceptable public health risk. The auditor recommended that the former townsite and other impacted areas defined in the report be classified as "Contaminated - Remediation Required". On 28 January 2008, the Department of Environment and Conservation classified Wittenoom as a contaminated site under the Contaminated Sites Act 2003.

However, opinion is not unanimous on the danger posed. Mark Nevill, a geologist and former Labor MLC for the Mining and Pastoral district, said in an interview in 2004 that the asbestos levels in the town were below the detection level of most equipment, and the real danger was located in the gorge itself which contains the mine tailings.

Residents once operated a camping ground, guest house and gem shop for passing tourists. The roof of the gem shop is now caved in and the wood of the guest house is rotten, while the camping ground is nowhere to be found.

It was reported in 2018 that thousands of travellers still visited the ghost town every year, as a form of extreme tourism.

The Australian Mesothelioma Registry (AMR) is a national database that keeps track of information about people who have been diagnosed with mesothelioma after July 2010. It records all new cases in order to help the government develop policies about how to deal with asbestos that still remains in the country and reduce the incidence of mesothelioma in the future.

The Wittenoom Closure Bill was reintroduced to the Western Australian Parliament in August 2021, and was passed on 24 March 2022. The bill enabled the compulsory acquisition and demolition of the 14 remaining privately-owned properties in the former townsite.

The traditional owners of country where Wittenoom is situated, the Panyjima people, have petitioned the Western Australian Parliament to not only remove all of Wittenoom's remaining buildings, but to remediate the land so that it is no longer contaminated.

The Wittenoom Closure Bill was passed by the Western Australian Parliament in March 2022, allowing the government to permanently close Wittenoom by compulsorily acquiring the remaining private properties and removing all infrastructure from the town. In September 2022, the last resident was evicted. As of September 2022, the town was classified as deserted, and closed to the public. A bushfire reportedly hit the area around 26 December 2022, causing damage to remaining buildings and disrupting plans to demolish the site during the 2023 dry season.

Legacy 

The 1990 Midnight Oil song, "Blue Sky Mine" and the group's album, Blue Sky Mining, was inspired by the town and its mining industry, as were He Fades Away and Blue Murder by Alistair Hulett.  The town and its history are also featured in the novel Dirt Music by Tim Winton.

Digital poet Jason Nelson created the work Wittenoom: speculative shell and the cancerous breeze, an interactive exploration of the town's death. It won the Newcastle Poetry Prize in 2009.

In the thriller novel The Dead Heart, by Douglas Kennedy, the plot involves an imaginary location called Wollanup, which corresponds to Wittenoom. The Dead Heart was adapted as a comic by Kennedy and the illustrator Christian de Metter, under the title Dead Heart.

See also
 Love Canal, New York
 Picher, Oklahoma
 Times Beach, Missouri
 Cassiar, British Columbia
 Clinton Creek

References

Bibliography

Further reading

External links 

 Wittenoom: Asbestos contamination and management (Western Australian Government)
 The Asbestos Disease Society of Australia

Ghost towns in the Pilbara
Mining towns in Western Australia
Company towns in Australia
1950 establishments in Australia
Hamersley Range
2007 disestablishments in Australia
Environmental disaster ghost towns
2007 in the environment
Shire of Ashburton
Asbestos mines